Collectives of Communist Youth (CJC) is a Spanish Marxist–Leninist youth organisation affiliated with the Communist Party of the Workers of Spain (PCTE). They have been publishing  ("Red Ink") since 2007.

History
The organisation was founded on January 13, 1985, not long after the PCPE was founded, as its youth organisation.

Nowadays the CJC have a stable presence in most areas of Spain, and after the Sixth Congress in 2005 they have grown considerably. They take part in World Federation of Democratic Youth, and in other international meetings.

They run many annual activities, such as the School of Central Formation "Trifón Medrano", or the Brigade of Solidarity to Cuba "Antonio Gades".

External links
 
  website

Youth wings of political parties in Spain
Youth wings of communist parties